Panthoides (fl. c. 275 BC) was a dialectician and philosopher of the Megarian school. He concerned himself with "the logical part of philosophy", and at some point taught the Peripatetic philosopher Lyco of Troas. He wrote a book called On Ambiguities, against which the Stoic philosopher Chrysippus wrote a treatise.

He disagreed with Diodorus Cronus concerning his Master Argument, arguing that something is possible which can never be true, and that the impossible can never be the consequence of the possible, and that therefore not everything that has happened is necessarily true. Diodorus' view was that everything that has happened must be true, and that therefore nothing is possible which can never be true.

Notes

References

3rd-century BC people
Hellenistic-era philosophers
Megarian philosophers